Bill Klesse is the former chairman and CEO of Valero Energy Corporation.  Mr. Klesse received a bachelor's degree in Chemical Engineering from the University of Dayton and earned an MBA in finance from West Texas A&M University.

References

University of Dayton alumni
West Texas A&M University alumni
Living people
Year of birth missing (living people)
American chief executives of energy companies